The Crocodile Hunter Diaries is a wildlife documentary television series first aired on cable TV channel Animal Planet. It was created as a spin-off to the original The Crocodile Hunter series hosted by Australian naturalist Steve Irwin and his wife Terri Irwin. In the UK it was aired on ITV. In Australia it was aired on Network Ten.

The show is more focused around the everyday lives of Steve, Terri, and the employees of Australia Zoo.  The first season (filmed in 1998 and aired in 2002) covered, among other things, Terri's pregnancy with her and Steve's first child Bindi, medical problems with Steve's dog Sui, the construction of the Crocoseum, daily ups and downs experienced by zoo staff on the job and animal rescue adventures.

Episodes

Season 1 (2002)
This season was shot in 1998.

Season 2 (2003)
This season was shot between 2001 and 2003.

Season 3 (2004−06)
This season was shot between 2003 and 2004.

See also

List of programs broadcast by Animal Planet

References

External links
 
 Animal Planet: Croc Diaries - Season 1
 Animal Planet: Croc Diaries - Season 2
 Animal Planet: Croc Diaries - Season 3

2002 American television series debuts
2002 Australian television series debuts
2006 American television series endings
2006 Australian television series endings
Animal Planet original programming
Network 10 original programming
ITV (TV network) original programming
Nature educational television series
2000s American documentary television series
2000s Australian documentary television series
2000s Australian reality television series
2000s American reality television series
Television shows set in Australia
Television shows filmed in Australia
English-language television shows
American television spin-offs
Australian television spin-offs
Steve Irwin
Television series about animals